The Aspetuck River is a  river in the U.S. state of Connecticut. The river flows generally southerly through Redding, Connecticut, to the Aspetuck Reservoir, the Hemlock Reservoir in Easton and Fairfield and finally into the Saugatuck River in Westport, Connecticut and then into the Long Island Sound. The word Aspetuck can be translated as "river originating at the high place" in an Algonquian language.

Recreation

Hiking
The Aspetuck Valley Trail is a Blue-Blazed Trail that follows the general course of the river.

Water quality
The Aspetuck is one of the cleanest rivers in the state, with an AA rating.

See also
List of rivers of Connecticut
East Aspetuck River

References

Rivers of Fairfield County, Connecticut
Rivers of Connecticut
Connecticut placenames of Native American origin
Redding, Connecticut
Tributaries of Saugatuck River